Strusshamn is an urban village in the municipality of Askøy in Vestland county, Norway. The village lies along the Byfjorden on the southern coast of the island of Askøy, just west of the large urban village of Kleppestø.  Strusshamn is one of the cultural centers of the municipality, and it is the site of the main church for the municipality, Strusshamn Church.

Strusshamn is well known for its long maritime traditions and history.  There are wooden buildings here dating back to around 1800.  The village was used in the 18th and 19th centuries as the quarantine harbour for the city of Bergen, located a few kilometres to the east.  Today, the production facilities for Viksund Boats is located in the village.  Strusshamn is connected to the city of Bergen by the Askøy Bridge.

References

External links
Havna
Activities in Strusshamn
Viksund Yachts of Norway situated in Strusshamn

Villages in Vestland
Askøy